La Intrusa (The Outsider) is a Mexican telenovela produced by Ignacio Sada for Televisa in 2001. It is a remake of the Venezuela telenovela Valentina, produced in 1975. It stars Gabriela Spanic, Arturo Peniche, Laura Zapata, Chantal Andere, Sergio Sendel, Karla Álvarez, Dominika Paleta and Guillermo García Cantú. 

It was the second collaboration on-screen between Spanic, Andere, and Paleta, who three worked in La usurpadora (1998).

Plot 
Rodrigo Junquera, who is close to death after an illness, decides to ask the nanny of his young child, Virginia Martínez, to marry him so she can look after his children when he's gone.

Virginia is a noble, young woman who is in love with Rodrigo's eldest son, Carlos Alberto.  After his death it is discovered that Virginia is Rodrigo's wife, the heir of all his wealth. Carlos Alberto, along with his siblings, then accuse her of being an ambitious woman who married Rodrigo in secret.

Virginia's ordeal begins  because she not only has to deal with the contempt of Carlos Alberto, who is still in love with her, but with the rudeness of Rodrigo's oldest children: Junior, Raquel, and Violeta. With the love of Aldo and Memo, the little ones, it makes coping with the existence within the mansion a little better.

Meanwhile, in another part of the country, a young woman named Vanessa is dedicated to deceiving millionaires in order to get their fortune, eager to get out of the miserable life she leads. She is the twin sister of Virginia, who has distanced herself so that their relationship is almost nil.

Beset by debt, Vanessa one day travels to Mexico where she meets Carlos Alberto, with whom she falls in love. However, despite her being a physical clone of Virginia, he despises her for her rudeness and impudence and just appearing like Virginia.

Virginia and Carlos Alberto marry, but after a series of faintings and loss of vision, Virginia discovers she has an inoperable brain cancer. At the same time, the medical findings confirm that she is pregnant. She finds that bringing the baby into the world can hasten the time of her fatal outcome. Virginia, disregarding the doctor's advice, decides to go ahead with the pregnancy. Blind and with the tumor extending inevitably, Virginia manages to give birth to a beautiful girl; but she dies afterwards.

The news of the death of her sister and the birth of her niece reaches Vanessa, who decides to go to Mexico to avenge all the slights Virginia suffered and to take care of her niece.

Cast

Main

Gabriela Spanic as Virginia Martínez Roldán and as Vanessa Martínez Roldán
Arturo Peniche as Carlos Alberto Junquera Brito
Laura Zapata as Maximiliana Limantour Bracho de Roldán
Chantal Andere as Raquel Junquera Brito
Sergio Sendel as Danilo Roldán Limantour
Karla Álvarez as Violeta Junquera Brito 
Dominika Paleta as Anabella Roldán Limantour
Guillermo García Cantú as Rodrigo "Junior" Junquera Brito / Rodrigo Rivadeneyra Vargas

Also main

Silvia Manríquez as Elena Roldán de Martínez
José María Torre as Aldo Junquera Brito
Sherlyn as Maricruz Roldán Limantour 
Marlene Favela as Guadalupe "Lupita" Rojas 
Claudio Báez as Alirio de Jesús Roldán
Jan as Johnny
Yessica Salazar as Tania Rivadeneyra Elias
Esther Rinaldi as Edith
Jorge De Silva as Raymundo 
Sharis Cid as Aracely Menchaca
Mónica Dossetti as Lic. Silvana Palacios
Marco Uriel as Santiago Islas
Alejandro Ruiz as Juvencio Menchaca
Diana Golden as Zayda Jimenez
Silvia Derbez as Sagrario Vargas (#1)
Bárbara Gil as Sagrario Vargas (#2)
Enrique Lizalde as Rodrigo Junquera / Hilario Santos (#1)
Carlos Cámara as Rodrigo Junquera / Hilario Santos (#2)
Roberto "Puck" Miranda as Arnulfo Castillo
Uberto Bondoni as Humberto Nava
Claudio Rojo as Joaquín Velarde
Milagros Rueda as Diosa
Julio Monterde as Dr. José "Pepe" Cartaya
Sergio Villicana as Guillermo "Memo" Junquera Brito
Sara Montes as Balbina
Eduardo Liñán as Inspector Torres
Carlos Torres as Padre Chema

Guest stars

Patricia Reyes Spíndola as Renata de Velarde
Silvia Caos as Evelia
Queta Lavat as Rosalía Bracho Vda. de Limantour
Irma Lozano as Laura Elías de Rivadeneyra
Gustavo Rojo as Víctor Rivadeneyra
Juan Pablo Gamboa as Esteban Fernández
Víctor Noriega as Dr. Eduardo Del Bosque Iturbide
Martha Roth as Norma Iturbide vda. de Del Bosque
Lorenzo de Rodas as Dr. Adrian Colmenares

Awards and nominations

References

External links 
 
 

Mexican telenovelas
Televisa telenovelas
2001 telenovelas
2001 Mexican television series debuts
2001 Mexican television series endings
Mexican television series based on Venezuelan television series
Spanish-language telenovelas
Television series about twins